The Chillesford Clay is a geologic formation in England dating to the Early Pleistocene Bramertonian stage. It preserves fossils.

See also

 List of fossiliferous stratigraphic units in England

References
 

Geology of England